Surbiton is a former rural locality in the Barcaldine Region, Queensland, Australia.

On 22 November 2019 the Queensland Government decided to amalgamate the localities in the Barcaldine Region, resulting in five expanded localities based on the larger towns: Alpha, Aramac, Barcaldine, Jericho and Muttaburra. Surbiton was incorporated into Alpha.

Geography 
The Belyando River forms the north-western boundary of the locality. Native Companion Creek flows from the south-west (Alpha/Beaufort) through to the north of the locality where it becomes a tributary of the Belyando River.

The Alpha Clermont Road passes through the locality from the south (Alpha) to the north-west (Quetta).

The principal land use is grazing on native vegetation.

History 
The origin of the name is unclear but there has been a Surbiton pastoral run since at least 1866 when it was operated by William Killgour.

Education 
There are no schools in Surbiton. There is a primary and secondary school in neighbouring Alpha, but only to Year 10. For Years 11 and 12 of secondary schooling, the nearest schools are in Clermont, Barcaldine and Emerald. Boarding schools and distance education are other options.

References 

Barcaldine Region
Unbounded localities in Queensland